Tessaropa elongata is a species of beetle in the family Cerambycidae. It was described by Galileo and Martins in 2009.

References

Methiini
Beetles described in 2009